Mataeocephalus is a genus of rattails.

Species
There are currently six recognized species in this genus:
 Mataeocephalus acipenserinus (Gilbert & Cramer, 1897) (Sturgeon grenadier)
 Mataeocephalus adustus H. M. Smith & Radcliffe, 1912
 Mataeocephalus cristatus Sazonov, Shcherbachev & Iwamoto, 2003
 Mataeocephalus hyostomus (H. M. Smith & Radcliffe, 1912)
 Mataeocephalus kotlyari Sazonov, Shcherbachev & Iwamoto, 2003 (Kotlyar's whiptail)
 Mataeocephalus tenuicauda (Garman, 1899) (Slendertail grenadier)

References

Macrouridae